Münster is one of the five Regierungsbezirke of North Rhine-Westphalia, Germany, located in the north of the state, and named after the capital city of Münster. It includes the area which in medieval times was known as the Dreingau.

Regierungsbezirk Münster mostly covers rural areas of Münsterland famous for their castles, e.g. Castle Nordkirchen and Castle Ahaus. The region offers more than a hundred castles, all linked up by the cycle path 100 Schlösser Route.

The three southern municipalities are part of the Ruhrgebiet, a densely populated region with much industry. Besides this the area is mostly as green as the rest of Münsterland and historically a part of the landscape.

The history of the Regierungsbezirk dates back to 1815, when it was one of the original 25 Regierungsbezirke created as a subdivision of the provinces of Prussia. The last reorganization of the districts was made in 1975, when the number of districts was reduced from ten to five, and the number of district-free cities from six to three.

Climate
The climate is mainly maritime, influenced by the recently deteriorating gulf stream.

Temperatures above 30 °C during the summer were rare until the 1980s. Recently some summer months got more hot and dry or cool and wet with an increased abundance of extreme weather.

In winter time temperatures deep frost below -10 °C occurs especially in times of Berlin Phenomenon and is rare in years without. Long time average temperatures about 1 °C in January and February mean, that frost is quite common.

Economy 
The Gross domestic product (GDP) of the region was 88.1 billion € in 2018, accounting for 2.6% of German economic output. GDP per capita adjusted for purchasing power was 30,900 € or 102% of the EU27 average in the same year. The GDP per employee was 94% of the EU average.

Traffic
A popular way to explore the Münsterland is by bicycle. The mostly flat landscape with its architectural and cultural gems invites cycling, both ambitious on-road riding (e.g. the Münsterland Giro race) and relaxed tours on small rural roads and Pättkes (minor paths, some are even unpaved). Embedded in a 4,500 km long network of cycle paths are not only the most popular themed routes, but also many small and large delightful tours and round courses through the region. Some infrastructure for cyclists with Bed & Bike farms, navigation systems, and service-stations make Münsterland a fine cycling area.The city of Münster itself is crammed with bikes and on a daily basis cyclists face traffic congestion, bike theft, parking problems and the like.

The road system is well-maintained and several highways offer fast access to nearly all areas.

In those areas where railroads haven't been closed down by the 1980s, frequent and fast service is offered. One streetcar system has survived in the city of Gelsenkirchen and many other towns and cities offer a fair bus network.
Rural areas are connected by bus, too. The service is tied to demand and rather poor in very remote places.

The Münsterland can be explored by boat on some canals, e.g. the Dortmund–Ems Canal and Wesel–Datteln Canal. They connect the area to the harbours in Duisburg and Münster, the German coast and the rest of the German waterway system.

Landmarks
Ahaus Castle
Gerleve Abbey
Herten Castle
Horst Castle
Hülshoff Castle - birthplace of Annette von Droste-Hülshoff
Lembeck Castle
Münster Cathedral
Nordkirchen Castle - the most important castle, also called "Westphalian Versailles" 
House of Rüschhaus
St. Lambertus Cathedral
Steinfurt Castle
Westerwinkel Castle
The Industrial Heritage Trail - big part of this collection of monuments originated by the industrial revolution is sited in the southern half of this area

References

External links

The Münsterland Tourism board
Münsterland Panoramas

 
Government regions of Germany
Geography of North Rhine-Westphalia
NUTS 2 statistical regions of the European Union
Government regions of Prussia